A voltage ladder is a simple electronic circuit consisting of several resistors connected in series with a voltage placed across the entire resistor network. Voltage ladders are useful for providing a set of successive voltage references, for instance for a flash analog-to-digital converter.

How it works
A voltage drop occurs across each resistor in the network causing each successive "rung" of the ladder (each node of the circuit) to have a higher voltage than the one before it. Ohm's law can be used to easily calculate the voltage at each node. 

Since the ladder is a series circuit, the current is the same throughout, and is given by the total voltage divided by the total resistance (V/Req), which is just the sum of each series resistor in the ladder. The voltage drop across any one resistor is now given simply by I*Rn, where I is the current calculated above, and Rn is the resistance of the resistor in question. The voltage referenced to ground at any node is simply the sum of the voltages dropped by each resistor between that node and ground. 

Alternatively, you can use voltage division to determine node voltages without having to calculate the current directly. By this method, the voltage drop across any resistor is V*Rn/Req where V is the total voltage, Req is the total (equivalent) resistance, and Rn is the resistance of the resistor in question. The voltage of a node referenced to ground is still the sum of the drops across all the resistors, but it's now easier to consider all these resistors as a single equivalent resistance RT, which is simply the sum of all the resistances between the node and ground, so the node voltage is given by V*RT/Req. 

Analog circuits